Nithecus jacobaeae is a species of seed bug in the family Lygaeidae, found in the Palearctic.

References

External links

 

Lygaeidae